The Raid on Souda Bay was an assault by Italian Royal Navy explosive boats on Souda Bay, Crete, during the first hours of 26 March 1941. After negotiating the boom defences, the small craft attacked the Royal Navy heavy cruiser  and the Norwegian tanker Pericles. The Allied vessels were both sunk in shallow waters by the explosive charges and eventually lost.

Background
Souda is a naturally protected harbour on the northwest coast of the island. It had been chosen as a target by the  months before because of the almost continuous Allied naval activity there. Air reconnaissance had spotted a number of naval and auxiliary steamers at anchor in Souda Bay, Crete.

Each MT (nicknamed  - "little boat") carried a  explosive charge inside its bow. The MTs were specially equipped to make their way through obstacles such as torpedo nets. The pilot would steer the assault craft on a collision course at his target ship, and then would jump from his boat before impact and warhead detonation.

The attack

Once inside the bay, the six boats, under the command of Lieutenant Luigi Faggioni, identified their targets: the heavy cruiser HMS York, a large tanker (the Norwegian Pericles of ), another tanker and a cargo ship. At 4:46, two MTs hit HMS York amidships, flooding her aft boilers and magazines, and the ship was beached by her own crew to avoid capsizing. Two seamen were killed by the explosions. Pericles was severely damaged and settled on the bottom, while the other tanker and the cargo ship were sunk, according to Italian sources. According to British reports, the other barchini apparently missed their intended targets, and one of them ended stranded on the beach. The antiaircraft guns of the base opened fire randomly, believing that the base was under air attack.

All six of the Italian sailors: Luigi Faggioni, Alessio de Vito, Emilio Barberi, Angelo Cabrini, Tullio Tedeschi, and Lino Beccati, were captured.

Aftermath

HMS York was disabled and grounded, though her antiaircraft guns still provided air defence to the harbour. On 21 March two divers assessing damage were killed by a near miss during an air strike. A salvage operation involving submarine HMS Rover, dispatched from Alexandria to assist York with electrical power, was abandoned due to the intensity of the air attacks, which damaged the submarine and forced her return to Egypt. The cruiser was evacuated and her main guns were wrecked with demolition charges by her crew before the German capture of Crete. As for the Pericles, she was taken in tow by destroyers, but broke in two and sank on 14 April 1941 en route to Alexandria during a storm.

The sinking of HMS York was the source of a controversy between the Regia Marina and the Luftwaffe over credit for her sinking. The matter was resolved by British war records and by the ship's own war log, captured by Italian naval officers who boarded the half-sunk cruiser.

After the war, the hull of HMS York was raised and towed to Bari, and scrapped there by an Italian shipbreaker in March 1952.

Notes

References
Frogmen First Battles by retired U.S. Captain William Schofield's book. 
The Naval War in the Mediterranean, 1940-1943 by Jack Greene & Alessandro  Massignani, Chatam Publishing, London, 1998. 
Sea Devils by J. Valerio Borghese, translated into English by James Cleugh, with introduction by the United States Naval Institute 
The Italian Navy in World War II by Marc'Antonio Bragadin, United States Naval Institute, Annapolis, 1957. 
The Italian Navy in World War II by Sadkovich, James, Greenwood Press, Westport, 1994.

External links
"Attack to Suda Bay" - RegiaMarina.net  
HMS York at Uboat.net
HMS York at Naval History.Net

Souda Bay
Souda Bay
Souda Bay
1941 in Greece
Souda Bay
Souda Bay
Maritime incidents in March 1941
Souda Bay
March 1941 events